Lawrence Pondani (born 27 September 1986) is a Zambian football midfielder who played for Red Arrows F.C.

References

1986 births
Living people
Zambian footballers
Zambia international footballers
Red Arrows F.C. players
Association football midfielders